Ozyorny (masculine), Ozyornaya (feminine), Ozyornoye (neuter), or Ozyornye (plural for all genders) may refer to:

Ozyorny (inhabited locality) (Ozerny, Ozyornaya, Ozyornoye), name of several inhabited localities in Russia
Ozyornaya (Moscow Metro), a metro station in Moscow, Russia.
Ozyornaya railway station, a railway station in Saint Peterburg, Russia
Ozerne (air base), an air base in Zhytomyr Oblast, Ukraine

Rivers 
 Ozernaya,a river in the Krasnoyarsk Krai of Russia on the island of October Revolution
 Ozernaya, a river in the Kamchatka Krai of Russia

See also
Ozyornye, a village in Kirov Oblast, Russia
Ozerne (disambiguation)